Wrexham County Borough is in north-east Wales, straddling the ancient border earthwork Offa's Dyke. There are 107 scheduled monuments in the county borough. The 29 Bronze Age and Iron Age sites are mainly found to the west of Offa's dyke, and are in the main burial mounds and hillforts on the uplands. To the east of the dyke are the majority of the 18 medieval sites, mainly domestic, defensive or ecclesiastical. Running through the centre are the 28 early medieval sites along Offa's Dyke, and 10 scheduled sections of the older Wat's Dyke. Close by, clustered around the coal and mineral deposits in a central belt are also the 19 post-medieval sites. These are extraction and industrial sites, plus the World Heritage Site at Pontcysyllte Aqueduct. The Wrexham administrative area lies within the two historic counties of Denbighshire and Flintshire.

Scheduled monuments have statutory protection. The compilation of the list is undertaken by Cadw Welsh Historic Monuments, which is an executive agency of the National Assembly of Wales. The list of scheduled monuments below is supplied by Cadw with additional material from RCAHMW and Clwyd-Powys Archaeological Trust.

Scheduled monuments in Wrexham

See also
List of Cadw properties
List of castles in Wales
List of hill forts in Wales
Historic houses in Wales
List of monastic houses in Wales
List of museums in Wales
List of Roman villas in Wales

References
Coflein is the online database of RCAHMW: Royal Commission on the Ancient and Historical Monuments of Wales, CPAT is the Clwyd-Powys Archaeological Trust, Cadw is the Welsh Historic Monuments Agency

Wrexham
Buildings and structures in Wrexham County Borough